Fallen In Love was published on January 24, 2012. The author of this novel is Lauren Kate. This book is a young adult fiction novel based on the characters from that author's most notable series, Fallen. The author takes these characters and writes more in depth about them, especially Lucinda and Daniel, and was inspired by her fans to write this novel. It is set during the most romantic holiday, Valentine's Day, and tells the stories of each couple in the book and how their dates play out. Each story in the book is narrated by that particular person.

Characters
Lucinda (Luce) Price:
She is the main character in the series. She spends Valentine's Day with Daniel.
Daniel Grigori: 
The male main character and Luce's boyfriend. They spend Valentine's Day together. 
Arriane Alter:
Another fallen angel. Her love story is defined as "Forbidden, a love so fierce it burns". This story reveals the cause of Arriane's scar and states that Arriane had a female lover. However, this is not mentioned in any of the books in the series.
Gabrielle (Gabbe) Givens: 
She is a fallen angel sided with God. She makes an appearance in Arriane's story.
Roland Sparks: 
A demon who sided with Lucifer, his story is defined as "Unrequited".
Miles Fisher:
He is a nephilim from Shoreline, Miles finds love where he least expects it.
Shelby:
A nephilim from Shoreline, she shares a love story with Miles on the book.
Rosaline:
She is Roland's platonical love and the second protagonist in his love story. She is not mentioned in any other book.
Tessriel:
Also known as Tess, she is Arriane's female lover. She is one of Lucifer's closest demons and tries to pull Arriane to Lucifer's side so they can be together.

Other books by Lauren Kate
The Betrayal of Natalie Hargrove
Fallen Series
Fallen
Torment
Passion
Rapture
Teardrop Series
Teardrop
Waterfall

References

External links
 Fallen series on Facebook
 Fallen series on Tumblr

Young adult fantasy novels
2012 American novels
Angel novels
Delacorte Press books